Italia's Next Top Model, Season 4 is the fourth season of Italia's Next Top Model based on the American program of the same name. It is broadcast on SkyUno, a channel of the Italian subscription television Sky TV. It premiered in Spring 2011.

The host is once again the Russian former model and actress Natasha Stefanenko. Other permanent judges are Micheal Giannini, art director and talent scout of model agency d’Management, former Italian top model and Giorgio Armani's muse Antonia Dell'Atte, fashion photographer Alberto Badalamenti and fashion journalist Giusi Ferré.

For the first time a former transgender contestant, Adriana Mazzarini, was admitted in the final cast.

Alice Taticchi resulted as the winner, getting a contract with Fashion Model Milan and an editorial for Lancôme.

Changes

Due to viewers' criticism on format changes introduced in season 3 the show returned to its original structure without audience and no more runway challenges at panel. The daily episodes were removed and weekly episodes were edited to cover one week of events.

The prizes changed for this season: Fashion Model Management replaced d'Management Group as the winner's agency - but art director of d'Management Michael Giannini still remained contestants' coach and judge - and the Max Factor campaign was replaced by an editorial spread for Lancôme.

Episode summaries

Episode 1
First aired January 7, 2011

For this season the cast was chosen in a live final casting episode where 24 hopefuls chosen in castings throughout the country presented themselves before the judges and a live audience. After the poll was reduced to 16, the girls, divided into groups of 4, showed their walks in themed runways and spoke about their lives and modelling ambitions. The finalists were chosen by the viewers' vote and out of each group of 4 girls only 3 would be finalists. Out of the 4 eliminated girls the judges eventually chose one girl to join the 12 already picked by the public vote. The 13 finalists were also joined by the winner of the web casting chosen by on-line voters to become an official finalist.

After the episode, Elizabeth withdrew from the competition due to personal reasons and was replaced by semi-finalist Rossella B. who had previously been left out for one vote from the judges' decision to reintroduce one of the 4 eliminees in the final cast.

Episode 2
First aired March 30, 2011

Natasha meets the 14 contestants in the city center of Milan and accompanies them in a limousine to their new home. She tells them they will be living in an entire palace and lets them think they will be staying in a luxurious accommodation. All the girls are thrilled in front of their new house but are faced with an unpleasant truth after entering. They indeed will be staying in an entire palace, but it is completely devoid of comforts they expected, with basic furniture, empty walls, small rooms and only two bathrooms for all of them. Later Michael will explain they wanted the girls to experience the real life models' house with small spaces and no comforts, crowded bedrooms and queues to use the bathroom. Although coping with disappointment, all the girls are ready to clean up the rooms with the exception of Valeria who shows a disgusted attitude towards their new home and refuses to do any housework, immediately claiming the more comfortable and only private bedroom for herself. Ginevra on the other hand shows to be pleased with this accommodation and states the only thing she needs is do modelling and critiques Valeria for her fussy demeanor and for her unwillingness to help in the domestic chores.

The next day the girls are put to test with their first reward challenge. Michael takes them to a nearby park, he has them dressed in an outfit for rainy days and asks the girls to show their walks and use an umbrella on the improvised runway. In the end Rossella B. is deemed the winner of this challenge by showing the most convincing walk. She is given two options: she can either take the private bedroom for herself or she can have workmen to come to the house to make it cozier. Rossella B. opts for the second choice and two workmen bring the girls some wall decorations, fix better lighting and build a runway for the girls to practice their walks. Meanwhile, all the contestant receive a prize consisting in new clothes.

The following day the girls are informed they will be doing their first photoshoot. On set Natasha tells them they will have to impersonate characters or fashion styles related to their personalities. After short individual talks with the host to decide which subject each girl will be portraying, they get prepared for the shoot. On set they have to take the shots by themselves using cameras with timers and quickly posing in front of them. Some girls like Alice, Ginevra, Rossella G. are at ease while others such as Adriana, Bruna and Lorenza struggle to create a pose. The girls represent the following subjects:

At panel the girls get evaluated on a full-body shot and a close-up photo. Alice, Benedetta, Francesca and Ginevra are praised for their shots and so is Rossella G. for producing a remarkable photo despite looking a bit common in person according to Giusi. Beatrice is warned to think more when on set and Ilaria is told she did not fully translate her own personality in her shot. Valeria gets mixed reviews while Veronica gets bad critiques for not embodying the mood she chose in her picture. Bruna's evaluations leads to a debate between Alberto - the photographer - and Michael - the girls' mentor - with the former accusing the latter of giving Bruna too many directions and confusing her, while in Alberto's opinion new models need to get little advising when they start doing photoshoots. Lorenza is critiqued for being stiff on set and for her pose not matching the subject she chose as well as for an overall bad shot. Adriana is scolded for her awkward pose and facial expression and for producing a lackluster picture that does not portray the femininity she always looked for in her life.

In the end Adriana and Lorenza are paired up in the bottom two for their performances on set and poor shots and Lorenza is sent home as she is deemed too uneasy in being photographed.

Bottom two: Adriana Mazzarini & Lorenza Celentano
Eliminated: Lorenza Celentano

Episode 3
First aired April 6, 2011

The girls are informed by Natasha Mail they will be getting makeovers. They are driven to Charme&Cheveux Salon where Michael and the hairstylists will be telling them their new looks. Rossella G. has the most radical change, being partly shaved and dyed platinum blond, but most of the girls receive minor changes with their hair being trimmed and colors being slightly changed. Soon tensions erupt when Francesca points out that, being already a natural blonde, she finds silly to have her hair dyed blonder. She questions her motivation to stay further and starts an argument with Veronica who judges Francesca whiny and disrespectful to other girls who are accepting their makeovers even if they do not agree with the change. Francesca refuses to speak to Veronica any longer and Ginevra comes to her defense by attacking Veronica for her intervention. Later Francesca goes through her makeover and Ginevra, upset for her new hairstyle, is comforted by Natasha.

Natasha pays a visit to the girls to have dinner with them. Their dinner ends emotionally with the host giving Adriana a letter from her mother who writes her to encourage her daughter, who went through difficult times being raised by her grandparents and getting a gender reassignment operation.

The next day Michael comes to the girls' house and has a catwalk lesson. Fashion model Silvia Dimitrova helps him in evaluating the girls. Alice, Francesca and Ginevra get positive reviews and Beatrice is told to have improved her walk. Giulia is found uncomfortable on the runway, Valeria is too tense and Benedetta's walk is noticed for its flaws. Michael asks Ginevra to help the girls practising. This leads Veronica to comment on Ginevra's inability to correct the contestants' flaws while Benedetta expresses her disappointment in herself for being inferior to other girls on the catwalk.

The following day the girls get Natasha Mail informing them they are taking part in their first runway challenge. The girls go to Istituto Marangoni where they will be walking for the fashion school designers. Each designer is assigned a number of girls as follows:

At panel Adriana, Beatrice, Francesca, Ginevra and Ilaria are praised for their performances. Bruna is asked to give more expression and show more spunk to make the difference. Valeria is reprimanded for her runway poses and Giulia for looking lifeless and tense. Benedetta is reduced to tears when she gets negative reviews for not looking like a model and being out of place on the catwalk, therefore she tries to convince the judges she is there to learn. Alice is deemed bored and emotionless by Antonia. Rossella B. and Veronica receive mixed reviews while Rossella G. is scolded for not being mentally present.

In the end Natasha calls Adriana, Ginevra and Ilaria as the three best ones with Ginevra being at the top of the pack for her weekly performance on the catwalk. Benedetta and Giulia land in the bottom two for their unconvincing walks and poor presence on the runway. Giulia is eventually eliminated.

Bottom two: Benedetta Piscitelli & Giulia Danieli
Eliminated: Giulia Danieli
Featured guest: Silvia Dimitrova, fashion model
Featured designers: Giulia Caserta, Silvia Gaviraghi, Gian Marco Iannello, Anna Mignanego, Marco Pasquali

Episode 4
First aired April 13, 2011

The girls are sent to the gym for their physical assessment and weekly training. Valeria complains she doesn't have a good relationship with physical activity and is not enthusiastic while doing her exercises.

Back to their house they find a letter written by Michael who inspectioned the rooms during their absence and found them dirty and untidy. Alice and Ilaria are therefore assigned the supervising role of a general house cleaning. After the girls completed their domestic work Michael comes to tell that they will be taking part in their weekly reward challenge. Antonia comes as well, bringing her private collection of outfits created by famous designers and Michael announces each girl will be wearing one of them and pose while he will be taking polaroid shots to evaluate which contestant shows the best posing skills. After their performance Michael and Antonia choose Alice as the winner of this challenge. She is given two options: she can either get a washing machine to simplify their housework or she can have a five-minute phone call home while each one of the other girls will be getting a one-minute call. Alice opts for the latter choice and tears are shed when the contestants get to speak to their loved ones. Some girls like Adriana, Francesca and Ginevra refuse to call home to avoid getting emotional.

The next day the girls get Natasha mail telling them they must get ready to leave. Later they are led into thinking they will be going to the airport while they are driven to Milan seadrome where they meet Natasha and olympic champion Antonio Rossi who will be supervising and helping them in a triathlon session before their photoshoot where the girls will pose to sell an energy drink. To be believable in their shots the girls must get tired doing physical efforts so they compete through a running contest, a bicycle race and a wall-climbing challenge. Valeria always results in being left behind and refuses to complete her wall-climbing task. Just after this each girl poses in the photo shoot to advertise the energy drink.

During the judging session Adriana, Alice, Benedetta, Rossella B. and Veronica are commanded for producing believable pictures and selling the product despite it was not a real advertisement. Ginevra is scolded by Natasha for not respecting the commercial assignment while other judges praise her posing ability. Following last week's debate over Benedetta's appeal as an actress more than a model she is asked to play some lines before the panel and after her actress impersonation the judges decide to reward the girls with a washing machine they did not get before. Benedetta is also praised for hiding her body flaws in her photo. Rossella G. gets mixed reviews with some judges not liking her pose and Natasha warning her to work on her glance. Francesca and Beatrice are reprimanded for their unconvincing shots and Natasha scolds Beatrice for not being physically fit and showing it in her picture. Valeria is heavily reprimanded by Natasha for not being professional and for giving up during the training session thus showing a deplorable lack of commitment and respect towards the other girls who did their duty in the challenge. Natasha also adds Valeria's photo is as poor as her behavior and Antonia criticizes her pose.

In the end Beatrice and Valeria are placed in the bottom two for their disappointing shots and despite her potential Beatrice gets sent home. 
 
Bottom two: Beatrice Pancaldi & Valeria Colosio
Eliminated: Beatrice Pancaldi
Featured photographer: Luca Cattoretti
Featured guest: Antonio Rossi, olympic athlete

Episode 5
First aired April 20, 2011

For this week's reward challenge the eleven remaining girls are brought in a store in the city center of Milan, there they are divided into 3 groups and will be working as sales assistants to show their ability to sell clothes. Most of the girls struggle but a few of them succeed in satisfying the clients. Bruna is declared the winner of the challenge and as a prize she gets ten minutes to pick all the clothes and accessories she likes from the store.

After the challenge Ilaria and Benedetta complain about Bruna's frequent use of colored contact lenses. Ilaria states she has an unfair advantage over the rest of them when she uses colored contacts because they make her stand out more in person and in photos and this upsets the two girls. Moreover, Benedetta underlines how Bruna always matches her outfits to her colored lenses.

The following day Michael announces the girls they will be having an acting lesson. On stage each girl must introduce herself to the rest of them and the acting coach evaluates their individual presentations, after that the contestants face themselves in pairs by telling what they like and what they do not like about each other. This leads to a confrontation between Ginevra and some of the girls after that Adriana expresses her dislike towards Ginevra for her being conceited and fake. Ginevra disagrees and states this is the way they probably see her because she has confidence in herself and in her abilities.

The next day the girls are brought to Milan Science Museum where they will be facing their second runway challenge. There they will be walking for Italian fashion designer Antonio Marras. After a fitting Antonio decides Ginevra is the most qualified girl to open the runway show. During the runway performance the designer comments with Natasha that Benedetta has a beautiful face but she looks more like an actress than a model.

In the judging session Alice, Francesca and Ilaria get praised for their walks and their presence on the runway. Ginevra is commanded for her opening walk but Natasha tells her to be more careful in using her arms. The judges constantly disagree with Alberto's opinion and this leads to mixed reviews given to many of the girls. Valeria's walk is deemed too fast while Alberto finds it suitable, Veronica's presence on the runway is questioned by Alberto but she gets positive reviews from the other judges for delivering a perfect performance. Bruna is noticed for her improvements and Natasha invites Ilaria to express her unfavorable opinion on Bruna's use of colored contacts. Subsequently, Natasha tells Bruna she will not be wearing those from now on. Adriana's facial expression on the runway are not liked by Alberto but are appreciated by other judges. Rossella B. receives compliments by Alberto but Michael states he expected more from her walk. Benedetta gets the most negative review by Alberto who points out there is not a model in her and in his opinion she does not even want to become a model. Antonia strongly disagrees on this comment. Rossella G. is scolded by Natasha for her wrong movements at the end of the runway and for not committing to be remarkable on the catwalk.

Finally, Natasha declares Francesca as the best runway performer of this week together with Ilaria as runner-up. Benedetta faces her second bottom two appearance but it is Rossella G. who ends up being this episode's eliminee.

Bottom two: Benedetta Piscitelli & Rossella Gambi
Eliminated: Rossella Gambi
Featured designer: Antonio Marras
Featured guest: Cecilia Vecchio, acting coach

Episode 6
First aired April 27, 2011

The ten remaining girls have a posing lesson with photographer Alberto Badalamenti. They are coached on how to produce a group shot without overshadowing one another. On set Valeria is deemed too vulgar by the photographer, much to the girl's surprise. Benedetta is eager to show Alberto she can photograph like a model to prove his previous critiques were wrong. At the end of the lesson Michael announces the girls that they will use their posing skills in a collective reward challenge: they must create a believable group shot by cooperating on set with one another, for that each of them poses wearing a sporty T-shirt. Michael reminds the girls that no one will get the prize if just a single girl fails in the shoot. In the end the photographer and the models' coach are satisfied with their work and each girl receives a letter from her family. Tears are shed by the contestants as they read encouragements from their beloved ones. Michael later adds that the girls must choose one of them to be awarded with an extra prize consisting in a visit from her mother. The girls opt to draw the winner's name and Ilaria is chosen. Ilaria's mother comes to the girls' house for one day-long visit that pleases her daughter.

The following day the girls are informed by Michael that they will be leaving for the Mont Blanc to do their photoshoot. After arriving the contestants enjoy a night out with Michael. The morning after they are brought on the mountain to prove themselves in this week's shoot. They are posing on the snow wearing just a swimsuit and an ecological fur at -5 °C and at a height of 3,400 meters. Michael advises the girls to try their poses in the backstage to avoid wasting time on set and get cold. Some girls are noticed for their energetic performances while others like Veronica or Bruna need to be coached by Natasha and Michael to be more aggressive in their posing. Ginevra's studied poses are critiqued on set by the two judges.

Back in Milan the girls face their evaluation at panel. Alice gets unanimous praise for her striking pose and face although Antonia warns her to tone up her body. Same advice is given by Antonia to Benedetta who satisfies the judges with a pose that hides her body flaws. Rossella B. is noticed for her captivating glance and Francesca is commended for her elegant shot, her icy glance and ambitious posing. Ilaria is commanded for producing a good shot but Natasha points out she always offers the same facial expression while Michael wants her to be more aware her movements instead of being all over the place while posing. Adriana's shot is found vulgar by Alberto while is praised by other judges for it hides her flaws. Veronica is scolded for producing a bad photograph and lacking energy, and Bruna for an overall disappointing result that makes the judges wonder if she could be a model given the lack of improvement. Valeria is criticized by Natasha for resulting unproportionate in her photo while Ginevra is deemed to be out-of-date in her posing and needs to be more updated.

Bruna and Veronica are eventually left in the bottom two for their poor photographs and Veronica is ultimately eliminated despite her potential.
 
Bottom two: Bruna Ndiaye & Veronica Fracastoro
Eliminated: Veronica Fracastoro
Featured photographer: Jacopo Moschin

Episode 7
First aired May 4, 2011

In this week's reward challenge Michael evaluates the contestants on their ability to create a style and show it on the runway. The nine remaining girls are divided into three groups of three and each group will choose clothes and accessories to wear for portraying a style in an improvised runway show in the models' house. Adriana, Bruna and Ginevra are the winning group of this challenge so they get to spend a night out in Milan. Just after the challenge an argument erupts between Adriana and Ilaria, with the latter accusing the winning group of an undeserved victory for choosing a vulgar styling. Adriana defends her team's work and Ilaria retaliates they were out of theme in their dressing choices.

The following day Michael brings the girls their mid-term reports. Alice and Francesca get high votes while Bruna, Benedetta and Valeria receive the lowest marks. Subsequently, Benedetta is assigned a specific training program to tone her body and Bruna has a lesson with a motivational coach to help herself in finding more confidence in her means, this makes Bruna feel more motivated to give her best in the following challenges.

For this week's photoshoot the contestants will imitate a photo of Natasha's. They are being photographed while screaming with energy. Bruna performs well on set, eager to make up for her underwhelming performance in the last week. Adriana, Francesca and Rossella B. struggle to get a shot.

At panel Bruna redeems herself with a great photo that earns her the judges' praises. Ginevra is commended as well for producing a good shot. Alice is liked by Natasha, however the host and Alberto point out that her pose and expression are out of theme since she represented a frightened scream instead of an energetic one. Same critique is given to Ilaria, whose picture is nonetheless praised for the outcome. Francesca's and Rossella B.'s shots are deemed some of the weakest: Francesca for being too exaggerate and Rossella for looking cheap. Alberto states that Valeria is starting to lose confidence in herself and this shows in the picture, Michael disagrees but finds Valeria's shot devoid of energy. Adriana is scolded by Antonia for her bad pose and for lacking energy.

For their weak shots Adriana and Valeria land in the bottom two, both for their second time. Adriana is ousted from the competition.

Bottom two: Adriana Mazzarini & Valeria Colosio
Eliminated: Adriana Mazzarini
Featured photographer: Luca Cattoretti

Episode 8
First aired May 11, 2011

Michael announces the girls they will be spending the week practising their runway walks with four professional male models to get ready for this week's runway challenge. Since the very first runway lesson the girls show their interest in the models and start commenting on their looks and attitudes but the contestants have to stay focused on their runway performances. In the end the male models choose the girls they will be walking with in the upcoming runway challenge.

This week's reward challenge revolves around presenting skills. The girls are brought to a TV studio to be tested, there they are asked to read a script in front of the camera and to be convincing in this task. Many girls find it difficult to pronounce foreign words correctly and in the end it is Benedetta who is chosen as the winner for her presence in front of the camera. Benedetta can be a guest in the backstage of Alessandro Dell'Acqua fashion show during Milan Fashion Week and gets to know the designer personally together with Ilaria, chosen by Benedetta to share such opportunity, much to the other contestants' jealousy.

After days of runway training the girls are driven to Antonio Riva's atelier, there they will be showing his collection of bridal gowns accompanied by the male models dressed as grooms. Alice and Ginevra show a perfect mastery of the runway in their respective performances and the designer points them as his own favorites. Francesca faces an obstacle while going up the catwalk and stops before tripping, but she eventually manages to recover from this mistake by delivering her performance on the catwalk.

At panel Ilaria gets unanimous praises for her elegant and refined performance that still confirms her as one of the best walkers in the group. Alice gets praised for her movements by Giusi but Alberto finds her too cold and apathetic on the catwalk, while other judges disagree with this. Alberto praises Rossella for her romantic performance but Michael reprimands her for mistaking her place on the runway forcing the male model to switch his position, which the judge finds unacceptable. Antonia commands Francesca for her recovery, on the contrary she still finds Benedetta to be insecure on the catwalk while Valeria is scolded by Natasha for her inappropriate shoulders' movements and her walk unsuitable to show a wedding dress. Ginevra is appreciated for her presence but the host warns her not to have a presumptuous attitude when walking.

Benedetta and Valeria land in the bottom two for their third time, both for still being unable to deliver a good performance on the runway. Valeria is eventually eliminated for an overall mediocre performance in the competition.

Bottom two: Benedetta Piscitelli & Valeria Colosio
Eliminated: Valeria Colosio
Featured designer: Antonio Riva
Featured guest: Gioia Marzocchi, TV announcer

Episode 9
First aired May 18, 2011

The seven remaining contestants get a visit by Natasha who wakes them up early in the morning to announce them they will be leaving for Spain for their next photoshoot. The girls are furtherly informed by Michael they will be doing a western themed photoshoot in Almería, in a set where western movies used to be filmed. The girls quickly pack their bags and leave for their international destination.

The following day the girls are tested in the weekly reward challenge. Michael divides them in groups and tells that they will be making three different photoshoots by themselves. They can choose to be models, photographers or both. Groups and themes are assigned as follows:

All the girls manage to interact well on set and overcome the language obstacle to get help from the local people in arranging the shoots. After evaluating their shots Michael declares Benedetta, Ginevra and Rossella B. the winners of this challenge so the three girls can get to spend a relaxing afternoon in the hotel's spa.

The next day the contestants go to a set where famous Spaghetti Western movies were filmed. There they get told they will be posing as cowgirls and he photographer asks them for a confident and dangerous attitude in front of the camera. Alice, Bruna and Ilaria manage to impress with their performance on set while Benedetta finds it difficult to pose in the sun and deliver the right movements. Ginevra is coached by Michael to get her shot and, once back home, the girl shows her concern about her own results this week.

In the judging session Alice gets praised for her intense shot. Bruna's photo starts a debate among the judges since Giusi and Michael command the girl's attitude and glance in her picture while Alberto, in constant disagreement with the others, finds it too sexy. Rossella B. gets positive feedbacks and so does Ilaria. Alberto warns Francesca to be more cohesive in her posing although her outcome is appreciated by the panel. Benedetta is scolded by Antonia for not being the protagonist in her shot because of her weak expression and pose. Ginevra is reprimanded for her photo which shows her stiffness and is seen as a step backwards in the girl's performance.

Benedetta and Ginevra are paired up in the bottom two and Benedetta is eliminated following four appearances at the bottom of the pack.

Bottom two: Benedetta Piscitelli & Ginevra Ficari
Eliminated: Benedetta Piscitelli
Featured photographer: Luca Cattoretti

Episode 10
First aired May 25, 2011

The six remaining girls are administered their second makeovers. Francesca once again has an emotional meltdown when she knows her hair is getting dyed blonder and cut shorter. Her unprofessional reaction is commented in a negative way by Ginevra.

Later the contestants have a make-up lesson where they learn how to create a smoky eyes make-up. Then the make-up artists puts them to test with their reward challenge: this week each of them has to replicate a make-up inspired to famous women. Alice is declared the winner of the challenge for her accurateness and as a prize she can make a wish and it will be fulfilled. Alice chooses to pay a visit back home so she leaves temporarily from Milan to greet her family in her hometown.

This week the contestants must play two opposite roles in a commercial for NGM Mobile Phones: every girl will interpret an immature girl and a grown-up confident woman to give the idea of the two aspects that coexist in the product. On set Ilaria's performance is natural and convincing, Alice manages to deliver and so does Bruna. Rossella has some problems in reminding her lines.

At panel Ilaria gets praised for her believable and lively commercial. Alice is commanded for her result although judged a bit too theatrical and Bruna's commercial is liked as well despite lacking some sparkle. The judges find Francesca, Ginevra and Rossella B. not believable in selling the product for their performances come out as overdone.

Ilaria is chosen as the best performer of the week and her commercial will be used by the client on the website, whereas Francesca and Rossella B. are placed in the bottom two for their unconvincing performances. Rossella B. is sent home.

Bottom two: Francesca Regorda & Rossella Bersani
Eliminated: Rossella Bersani
Featured guest: Umberto Spinazzola, director

Episode 11
First aired June 1, 2011

Michael pays a visit to the models' house to talk with Alice and Ginevra. Alice has always been commanded for her results in the competition but Antonia has often criticized her for not having a toned body, therefore Alice assures Michael she is ready to commit herself more in her physical exercises to tone up her body. Ginevra, on the other hand, has experienced an emotional meltdown at panel after being critiqued negatively in the previous episode, so Michael encourages her to believe more in herself and her own potential as a model. Subsequently, Michael gives the girls some letters from their families.

Later the girls go to the gym for their exercise routine and Alice is taught further exercises to do at home to improve her body shape. Just after coming back home the girls are told they will have to face their weekly reward challenge. They are brought to a swimsuits and underwear store where they will pose in groups to display the lingerie collection in front of passers-by who express their preferences. Alice comes out as the winner of the challenge and is awarded with a collection of lingerie and bathing suits.

For this week's photoshoot the girls will pose on a horseback with old-fashioned dresses. They have to impersonate dreamy women to evocate a romantic atmosphere. Alice finds a bit difficult to get the right mood but thanks to Michael's coaching she finally manages to deliver her shot. Francesca and Ilaria perform well in front of the camera while Bruna is still unaware of her movements.

In the judging room Francesca redeems herself with a praiseworthy photo that fully captures the assigned mood. Alice's photo is considered as disappointing by Alberto and Bruna gets once again scolded for still being unable to control her face and pose at the same time.

Alice and Bruna are paired in the bottom two and Bruna becomes this week's eliminee for her lack of improvement.

Bottom two: Alice Taticchi & Bruna Ndiaye
Eliminated: Bruna Ndiaye
Featured photographer: Alberto Badalamenti

Episode 12
First aired June 8, 2011

The four remaining contestants get told they will be leaving their home for a luxurious accommodation. After packing their bags they are driven to a 5-star hotel in the center of Milan where they will be staying in luxury rooms with every comfort. Just after arriving the contestants have a casting lesson where they are asked to present themselves and show their walks or poses in front of a casting director. Ilaria has some difficulties in speaking English.

Later the girls are brought to Radio Italia studios where they will do a radio interview as reward challenge. The radio speaker asks them to talk about themselves and interact with him to see who is able to handle the pressure of an interview. Most of the girls manage to be easy-going while speaking but Ginevra is still uncomfortable in a talking role. In the end Francesca is proclaimed winner of the challenge for her pleasant interview and gets the opportunity to have a dinner out with the judges much to the others' jealousy and especially Ginevra's.

The following day the girls have a one-on-one talk with Natasha to explain why each of them should win and right after they do a beauty shoot with paint on their faces. The girls perform well on set and Ginevra manages to recover after the paint drips in her eyes.

At panel the girls are evaluated not only on their pictures but also on their runway walks after an improvised catwalk test in front of the judges. Alice is commanded by Antonia for her pace on the runway and for her elegance in her beauty shot. Francesca is praised by Michael for showing an elegant yet aggressive catwalk performance and for delivering a great photo this week. Natasha comments the rivalry with other girls has pushed her to show a new strength. Ilaria is told she seems to have lost her good runway walk all of a sudden and Alberto finds her photo not convincing because of her expression and her glance. Ginevra is scolded by the judges for looking lifeless and tense in her walk and unconvincing in her photo, which leads the girl to burst into tears for her disappointing results.

In the end Ginevra and Ilaria find themselves in the bottom two and despite her overall good performance Ilaria is eliminated for the judges feel Ginevra has more potential.

Bottom two: Ginevra Ficari & Ilaria Tiburzi 
Eliminated: Ilaria Tiburzi
Featured photographer: Jacopo Moschin
Featured guests: Anna Peggion, model scout & Mirko Mengozzi, radio speaker.

Episode 13
First aired June 15, 2011

After being announced their last photoshoot the three finalists are driven to Lake Como where they will be shooting an editorial for Vanity Fair in a historical palace. The contestants must impersonate aristocratic ladies waiting for an evening ball, dressed in 1930s-style gowns. After the photoshoot the judges evaluate their photos and each finalist is praised for the elegance shown in the picture. Unfortunately only two girls can walk in the final runway and Francesca is eliminated.

Bottom two: Francesca Regorda & Ginevra Ficari
Eliminated: Francesca Regorda

Alice and Ginevra are brought to the Fondazione Gianfranco Ferré where they do a fitting before the final runway. The two finalists will be wearing historic creations of the designer. On the final runway both girls show their walking skills. After the runway show the judges praise the contestants for their impeccable performances and after evaluating their journeys the two girls are called back and Alice is revealed as the winner for displaying an innate elegance in her photos, for her refined walk and her overall consistency throughout the entire competition.

Final two: Alice Taticchi & Ginevra Ficari
Runner-up: Ginevra Ficari
Italia's Next Top Model: Alice Taticchi
Featured photographer: Giovanni Gastel
Featured guest: Rita Airaghi, director-general of Fondazione Gianfranco Ferré

Contestants
(ages stated are at start of contest)

Semi-finalists

Finalists

Summaries

Call-Out Order

 The contestant quit the competition
 The contestant was eliminated 
 The contestant won the competition

 In episode 1, Alice entered the competition as a wildcard, while Valeria entered for having won an online casting. Additionally, Elizabeth quit the competition. She was replaced by Rossella B. the following episode.
 In episode 3, Ginevra, Adriana, and Ilaria took part in a shared call-out. 
 In episode 5, Francesca and Ilaria took part in a shared call-out.

Episode 1 = Casting Portrait Editorial In Gowns Couture And Bikini In Alaska

Episode 2 = Horizontal And Vertical Commercial While Free Falling From The Height

Episode 3 = Floor Simplistic High Fashion Editorial

Episode 4 = Fairy Love Telling Story With Male Model In Upside Down,Dramatical Flying Pirate

Episode 5 = Beauty in Disaster Victims

Episode 6 = Semi Mystique Couture Photoshoot In Old Building With Dark Smoke Effects

Episode 7 = Traditional Versus Industrian Modern Fashion In Catalogue

Episode 8 = Crime Coorporation In Short Film

Episode 9 = Different Type of American Airline Passenger Photo While Flying In Air

Episode 10 = Sri Lankan Royal Ancient Warriors

Episode 11 = Nepalese Monk

Episode 12 = Photoshoot For Nepal Harper's Bazaar, Editorial Of Hinduism Festival

Episode 13 = Trampoline Counstries Heroes & Wild Angriest Black Team Battle In Home

Episode 14 = Classic Italian Art Fashion Show & Medieval Civilization Era Runway

Episode 15 = Super Glam On The Beach

Episode 16 = Avant Garde Semi Gotic In Paris, Winner Battle Short Film,France Vogue Magazine, Supermodel Motion Hair For Pantene,Special Documenter Video

Challenges guide
Episode 2: Self-Taken Photos
Episode 3: Runway challenge for Istituto Marangoni designers
Episode 4: Photoshoot for an energy drink mock ad
Episode 5: Runway challenge for Antonio Marras
Episode 6: Photoshoot on the snow with swimsuits and ecological furs  
Episode 7: Photoshoot with scream
Episode 8: Runway challenge for Antonio Riva
Episode 9: Photoshoot representing cowgirls
Episode 10: Commercial for NGM mobile phones
Episode 11: Photoshoot on a horse 
Episode 12: Beauty shots with paint
Episode 13: 1930s-inspired editorial photoshoot for Vanity Fair / Final runway show for Maison Gianfranco Ferré

References

External links 
 Italia's Next Top Model Official Site
 

4
2011 Italian television seasons